Savo Kovačević (born 15 August 1988) is a Serbian professional footballer who plays as a forward.

While playing for Sloboda Užice, Kovačević was the third-highest scorer in the 2011–12 Serbian SuperLiga with 12 goals. He also played professionally in Switzerland, Kazakhstan, and Austria, respectively.

External links
 
 

Association football forwards
Expatriate footballers in Austria
Expatriate footballers in Kazakhstan
Expatriate footballers in Switzerland
FC Spartak Semey players
FC St. Gallen players
FK Cement Beočin players
FK Proleter Novi Sad players
FK Radnički 1923 players
FK Sloboda Užice players
Kazakhstan Premier League players
Serbian expatriate footballers
Serbian expatriate sportspeople in Austria
Serbian expatriate sportspeople in Kazakhstan
Serbian expatriate sportspeople in Switzerland
Serbian First League players
Serbian footballers
Serbian SuperLiga players
Footballers from Novi Sad
1988 births
Living people